Fleet Farm (formerly Mills Fleet Farm) is an American retail chain of 48 stores in Minnesota, Iowa, Wisconsin, North Dakota and South Dakota. Headquartered in Appleton, Wisconsin, the company has a main distribution center in Chippewa Falls, Wisconsin, with a buying/support office and warehouse in Appleton.

The stores range in size from small hardware store formats to larger stores. They sell hunting and fishing equipment and licenses, small appliances, household goods, automotive goods, clothing and footwear, toys, food, hardware, lawn and garden supplies, paint, pet supplies, sporting goods, tools, and farm supplies. Most locations also have an auto service center, gas mart, and car wash.

On July 10, 2019, Fleet Farm announced that it had reached a deal with SECURA Insurance to purchase their current headquarters building in Appleton. Fleet Farm moved its headquarters to the former SECURA Insurance building in 2020.

History
Stewart C. Mills Sr. founded Mills Companies in Brainerd, Minnesota in 1922. The family later created an oil company and opened a dealership and auto parts stores. Fleet Farm was founded in 1955 by Stewart Mills Sr. and his sons Henry Mills II and Stewart Mills Jr. The first store, named Fleet Wholesale Supply, was opened in Marshfield, Wisconsin.

Similarly named Blain's Farm and Fleet was also founded in 1955 by Bert and Claude Blain, friends of the Mills family. The two families agreed to use similar names and have historically operated in different territories.

In 2016, Mills Fleet Farm was sold to the private equity firm Kohlberg Kravis Roberts for an undisclosed amount rumored to be around $1.2 billion.
As of July 2018, the "Mills" part of the name has been dropped, shortening the name to "Fleet Farm". In addition, Fleet Farm launched a new brand campaign and added the tagline “Built for real life”, replacing the slogan "We Love It" which debuted in 2009.

Store brands

Fleet Farm carries a variety of store brands in a variety of departments. These include:
Road Runner      - Batteries and tires,
Big Max          - Trailers and automotive supplies,
Field and Forest - Clothing and footwear,
Fleet Boutique   - Women's clothing,
Dura-Built       - Farm supplies,
Milkhouse brand  - Dairy supplies,
Farm Life        - Animal supplements,
Sprout           - Animal feed,
Mills Fleet Farm - Candy and nuts,
Farm Toys.

Images

References

External links
 

Farm and ranch supply stores of the United States
Retail companies established in 1955
1955 establishments in Wisconsin
Companies based in Wisconsin
Agriculture companies established in 1955
American companies established in 1955